Rezeda Aleyeva (born 13 December 1967) is a Kazakhstani water polo player. She competed in the women's tournament at the 2000 Summer Olympics.

References

1967 births
Living people
Kazakhstani female water polo players
Olympic water polo players of Kazakhstan
Water polo players at the 2000 Summer Olympics
People from Ulyanovsk